Pyrausta pyrocausta is a moth in the family Crambidae described by George Hampson in 1899. It is found in the Brazilian states of São Paulo and Paraná.

The wingspan is about 20 mm. The forewings are yellow, suffused with fulvous brown. The hindwings are orange yellow, with a black postmedial line and a fuscous terminal band, as well as a terminal series of black points.

References

Moths described in 1899
pyrocausta
Moths of South America